Manfred Schüler (30 March 1935 – 2001) was a German speed skater. He competed at the 1960 Winter Olympics in the 500 m and 1500 m events and finished in 24th and 18th place, respectively. 

Personal bests:
500 m – 41.6 (1973)
 1500 m – 2:16.1 (1960)
 5000 m – 8:37.5 (1961)
 10000 m – 18:32.3 (1962)

References

External links
Manfred Schüler. speedskatingstats.com

1935 births
2001 deaths
German male speed skaters
Olympic speed skaters of the United Team of Germany
Speed skaters at the 1960 Winter Olympics